The brant or brent goose (Branta bernicla) is a small goose of the genus Branta. There are three subspecies, all of which winter along temperate-zone sea-coasts and breed on the high-Arctic tundra.

The Brent oilfield was named after the species.

Description

The brant is a small goose with a short, stubby bill. The under-tail is pure white, and the tail black and very short (the shortest of any goose).

The species is divided into three subspecies:
 Dark-bellied brant goose B. b. bernicla (Linnaeus, 1758) 
 Pale-bellied brant goose B. b. hrota (Müller, 1776) (also known as light-bellied brent goose in Europe, and Atlantic brant in North America)
 Black brant goose B. b. nigricans (Lawrence, 1846) (sometimes also known as the Pacific brant in North America)

Some DNA evidence suggests that these forms are genetically distinct; while a split into three separate species has been proposed, it is not widely accepted, with other evidence upholding their maintenance as a single species.

The body of the dark-bellied form B. b. bernicla is fairly uniformly dark grey-brown all over, the flanks and belly not significantly paler than the back. The head and neck are black, with a small white patch on either side of the neck. With a population of about 250000, it breeds on the Arctic coasts of central and western Siberia and winters in western Europe, with over half the population in southern England, the rest between northern Germany and north-western France.

The pale-bellied brant B. b. hrota appears blackish-brown and light grey in colour. The body is different shades of grey-brown all over, the flanks and belly are significantly paler than the back and present a marked contrast. The head and neck are black, with a small white patch on either side of the neck. The total population is about 250000, with the main population breeding in northeastern Canada and wintering along the Atlantic coast of the U.S. from Maine to Georgia, and two smaller populations, one breeding in Franz Josef Land, Svalbard, and northeastern Greenland and wintering in Denmark, northeast England, and Scotland, and the other breeding in the far-northeastern Canadian islands and wintering in Ireland, southwest England, and in a small but significant area, le Havre de Regnéville, centered on the Sienne Estuary in Manche (Northern France). In Ireland it is recorded in winter from a number of areas including Lough Foyle, Strangford Lough, Tralee Bay and Castlemaine Harbour.

The black brant B. b. nigricans appears blackish-brown and white in colour. This form is a very contrastingly black and white bird, with a uniformly dark sooty-brown back, similarly coloured underparts (with the dark colour extending furthest back of the three forms) and a prominent white flank patch; it also has larger white neck patches, forming a near-complete collar. The population of about 125000 breeds in northwestern Canada, Alaska and eastern Siberia, and winters mostly on the west coast of North America from southern Alaska to California, but also some in east Asia, mainly Japan, also Korea and China. The population has been as high as 200,000 in 1981, and as low as 100,000 in 1987.

The Asian populations of the black brant populations had previously been regarded as a separate subspecies B. b. orientalis based on purported paler upperparts coloration; however, it is generally now believed that this is not correct, and they are assigned to B. b. nigricans.

A fourth form (known variously as gray brant, intermediate brant, or grey-bellied brent goose) has been proposed, although no formal subspecies description has been made as yet, for a population of birds breeding in central Arctic Canada (mainly Melville Island), and wintering on Puget Sound on the American west coast around the U.S./Canada border. These birds are intermediate in appearance between black brant and pale-bellied brant, having brown upperparts and grey underparts which give less of a contrast with the white flank patch. It has also been proposed that, rather than being a separate subspecies, it is actually a result of interbreeding between these two forms, given that this population exhibits mixed characters.

Individual birds when wintering generally remain in loose family-groups, together with others of the same sub-species, but there is overlap in some areas (for example Western Europe, see above); and this is also true in the breeding colonies. Outside the breeding season, individuals with characteristics of any subspecies may occasionally turn up with regular migrants, and there has been debate as to whether this is related to migration routing accidents, or to breeding range overlap, or even interbreeding.

Habitat

The brant goose was strictly coastal bird in winter, rarely leaving tidal estuaries, where it feeds on eelgrass (Zostera marina) and the seaweed, sea lettuce (Ulva). On the east coast of North America, the inclusion of sea lettuce is a recent change to their diet, brought about by a blight on eelgrass in 1931. This resulted in the near-extirpation of the brant. The few that survived changed their diet to include sea lettuce until the eelgrass eventually began to return. Brants have maintained this diet ever since as a survival strategy. A similar collapse in eelgrass in Ireland in the 1930s also negatively impacted the population. In recent decades, it has started using agricultural land a short distance inland, feeding extensively on grass and winter-sown cereals. It has been suggested that they learnt this behaviour by following other species of geese. Food resource pressure may also be important in forcing this change, as the world population increased over 10-fold to 400,000-500,000 by the mid-1980s, possibly reaching the carrying capacity of the estuaries. In the breeding season, it uses low-lying wet coastal tundra for both breeding and feeding. The nest is bowl-shaped, lined with grass and down, in an elevated location, often near a small pond.

The brant goose is one of the species to which the Agreement on the Conservation of African-Eurasian Migratory Waterbirds applies.

Etymology
Branta is a Latinised form of Old Norse brandgás, "burnt (black) goose", and bernicla is the medieval Latin name for the barnacle. 

The brant and the similar barnacle goose were previously considered one species, formerly believed to be the same creature as the crustacean. That myth can be dated back to at least the 12th century. Gerald of Wales claimed to have seen these birds hanging down from pieces of timber, William Turner accepted the theory, and John Gerard claimed to have seen the birds emerging from their shells. This myth arose because in the 1100s the migration of birds was unknown, but it was known that none of these birds was ever seen nesting, nor were eggs found, nor were goslings seen.

The legend persisted until the end of the 18th century. In County Kerry, until relatively recently, Catholics could eat this bird on a Friday because it counted as fish.

References

Further reading
Millington, Richard (1997). Separation of Black Brant, Dark-bellied Brent Goose and Pale-bellied Brent Goose Birding World 10(1):11–15; an identification paper
 
  (this paper presented claims that Black Brant and Dark-bellied Brent Goose were interbreeding extensively in the Russian Arctic)
Sangster, George (2000). Taxonomic status of bernicla and nigricans Brent Goose British Birds 91(12):565–572 (a critical re-evaluation of the claims made in the above paper by Syroechkovski et al.)

External links

 BirdGuides Brent Goose Page
 Brent Goose at RSPB: Birds by Name
 BBC Nature - Brent Goose 
 Stamps from Canada, Germany, and Jersey at bird-stamps.org (the Brent goose has also featured on stamps from Eire, Finland, and Oman; these can easily be found via any internet search-engine).   
 
 
 Brant Goose, B.C. Outdoor Wilderness Guide

Branta
Geese
Birds of the Arctic
Natural monuments of Japan
Native birds of Alaska
Birds described in 1758
Taxa named by Carl Linnaeus
Holarctic birds